Lipinka may refer to:

 Lipinka (Olomouc District), village and municipality in the Czech Republic.
 Lipinka, Lubusz Voivodeship, village in Poland
 Lipinka, Pomeranian Voivodeship, village in Poland